The 1948 Colorado Buffaloes football team was an American football team that represented the University of Colorado as a member of the Big Seven Conference  during the 1948 college football season. Led by first-year head coach Dallas Ward, the Buffaloes compiled an overall record of 3–6 with a mark of 2–3 in conference play, placing fourth in the Big 7.

Schedule

References

Colorado
Colorado Buffaloes football seasons
Colorado Buffaloes football